The 1971 Marshall Thundering Herd football team (sometimes referred to as the Young Thundering Herd) represented Marshall University as an independent during the 1971 NCAA University Division football season. Led by first-year head coach Jack Lengyel, the Thundering Herd compiled a record of 2–8. Nate Ruffin was the team captain. Marshall played home games at Fairfield Stadium in Huntington, West Virginia.

Before the season

Previous season
On November 14, 1970, Southern Airways Flight 932, which was chartered by the school to fly the 1970 Marshall Thundering Herd football team and fans to Greenville, North Carolina for a game against the East Carolina Pirates and back to Huntington, West Virginia, crashed on approach to Tri-State Airport after clipping trees just west of the runway and impacting nose-first into a hollow.  All 75 people on board died. It was the worst single air tragedy in NCAA sports history.  The 1970 Marshall University football team was coached by Rick Tolley and finished with a record of 3–6.

New coaching staff
Marshall lost much of their coaching staff and their athletic director in the crash. Joe McMullen was hired to be the new AD. Georgia Tech assistant coach Dick Bestwick was hired to be the head coach. However, after two days he returned to Georgia Tech. William "Red" Dawson was named acting head coach, and later signed 21 prospects from five states. Wooster coach Jack Lengyel was eventually hired to fill the position. Dawson, an assistant coach, had gone on a recruiting trip instead of flying back with the team after the ECU game in 1970, and Lengyel convinced him to stay around for the 1971 season, providing some continuity. Dawson would retire from coaching following the season.

Freshmen eligibility waiver
Prior to and during the 1971 season the NCAA did not allow freshmen to compete in varsity football. Marshall requested and was granted a waiver to allow freshmen to compete so that they could field a complete team. Due to the age of the players on the team coach Lengyel nicknamed them the Young Thundering Herd. Beginning with the 1972 season the NCAA allowed freshmen to compete for all varsity football teams.

Construction of the roster
In addition to the true freshmen who were allowed to play the roster featured three players from the previous year's varsity team. Defensive backs Felix Jordan and Nate Ruffin had both missed the ECU game due to injuries, and defensive lineman Eddie Carter had missed the ECU game due to personal matters. As freshmen had not been allowed to play on the varsity team in 1970, the 1971 roster also had many sophomores that had been recruited to Marshall.

Aside from nine players who did not board the flight, the 1971 team consisted of walk-ons, former servicemen and three basketball players who had used their fifth year of eligibility to play for the football team. 50 players tried out for the team, with 35 being accepted as walk-ons. Lengyel dubbed his team the "Young Thundering Herd," and to motivate the team, President Richard Nixon wrote, "Friends across the land will be rooting for you, but whatever the season brings, you have already won your greatest victory by putting the 1971 varsity on the field." The letter was later read by Legyel to the team at the first day of practice.

The team did not have a placekicker and held tryouts. Blake Smith, who had never attended a football game, would ultimately win the job.

Coaching staff
 Jack Lengyel, Head coach
 William "Red" Dawson, defensive coordinator
 Jim McNally, Offensive line 
 Mickey Jackson, Receivers
 Bill Urbanik, Defensive line

Schedule

The season
For the season opener, the team visited the Morehead State Eagles for the I-64 Rivalry. Despite losing 29–6, the Herd managed to score late in the game with Reggie Oliver's touchdown pass to Tom Smyth, prompting a standing ovation from the crowd.

We Are Marshall
The event and its aftermath were dramatized in the 2006 Warner Brothers motion picture, We Are Marshall, starring Matthew McConaughey as Jack Lengyel and Matthew Fox as Red Dawson.

References

Marshall
Marshall Thundering Herd football seasons
Marshall Thundering Herd football